The 2007 NASCAR Busch East Series was the 21st season of the Busch East Series, a stock car racing series sanctioned by NASCAR. The season consisted of thirteen races and began on April 28 at Greenville-Pickens Speedway with the Greased Lightning 150. The season finale, the Sunoco 150, was held on September 21 at Dover International Speedway. Mike Olsen entered the season as the defending drivers' champion. Joey Logano won the championship, 166 points in front of Sean Caisse.

This season was the last season with Anheuser-Busch's Busch Beer as the series' title sponsor after a 21-year relationship. Busch was replaced by Camping World as the title sponsor for 2008.

By virtue of NASCAR's lower age limit of 16 starting this year for its touring series, Logano became the youngest champion of the series at that time. He started the season when he was just 16 years old, and turned 17 during the season on May 24. The lowering of the age limit in 2007 was instrumental in the future of the series, as most of the drivers who compete in the East Series now are teenagers. The age limit would eventually be lowered again to 15, which is what it is today.

Schedule

* Races will air on delay only. All HDNet races will air live and re-air on SPEED.

Television
Both HDNet and SPEED returned to broadcast most of the races. HDNet broadcast nine of the races, including the final seven, live in high definition.  Speed aired three of the remaining four races by a broadcast delay.  All of the races shown on HDNet were also re-broadcast in standard definition on Speed.

2007 Series Races

Greased Lightning 150 
The Greased Lightning 150 was run on April 28 at Greenville-Pickens Speedway in Greenville, SC.  Joey Logano sat on the pole for the event and went on to win the event.  This marked Logano's first pole and first win in the series in his first start.

Did not Qualify: (8) Jonathan Cash (#59), Jonathan Smith (#5), Pierre Bourque (#7), James Pritchard Jr. (#41), Jeremy Clark (#25), Tim Cowen (#75), Glenn Sullivan (#15), Blair Addis (#8)

Notes: ''Logano's win in his first start in the series made him the first driver to repeat this feat since Kip Stockwell got his only win in his first start in the series at Thunder Road International SpeedBowl in 1997.

Minnesota 150 
The Minnesota 150 took place on May 18 at Elko Speedway in Elko, Minnesota.  This race marked the first time that the East and West series would meet during the regular season for a points race.  Sean Caisse took the pole and went on to win the race.  Only he and fellow East series competitor Mike Olsen would lead the race.

Did not Qualify: (16) Ryan Foster (#21W), John Salemi (#63E), Stan Silva Jr. (#65W), Eric Richardson (#20W), Jim Inglebright (#1W), Scott Bouley (#26E), Chase Austin (#64E), Dion Ciccarelli (#84E), Germán Quiroga (#12E), Lloyd Mack (#09W), Jack Sellers (#15W), Blair Addis (#3E), Daryl Harr (#71W), Jerick Johnson (76E), Mike Gallegos (#77W), Pierre Bourque (#7E)

Note: Both series would meet again 2 days later for the second and final combination race at Iowa Speedway

Featherlite Coaches 200 
The Featherlite Coaches 200 was run on May 5 at the Iowa Speedway in Newton, Iowa.  This race, sponsored by Featherlite Coaches, was the second and final meeting between the East and West series during the regular season.  Kevin Harvick was on hand to take part in the race. Harvick would narrowly take the pole over Joey Logano.  These two drivers would proceed to swap the lead 15 times between the two of them.  In the end, it would be Logano taking the win over the Nextel Cup star.

Did not Qualify: (10)  Chase Austin (68 E), Mike Gallegos (77 W), Stan Silva Jr. (65 W), Chris Bristol (12 E), Kyle Cattanach (59 W), Jerick Johnson (76 E), Scott Bouley (26 E), Tim Woods III (54 W), Jack Sellers (15 W), Trevor Bayne (00 E)

South Boston 150 
The South Boston 150 was run on June 2 at the South Boston Speedway in South Boston, Virginia.  Peyton Sellers, who was the track's Late Model champion in 2005 en route to winning the NASCAR Whelen All-American Series title and also has a grandstand at the track named after him took the pole in qualifying.  The race turned into a two-man race between Sellers and Matt Kobyluck swapping the lead for eleven of the twelve lead changes.  Sellers lead a race high of 101 laps while Kobyluck lead 46.  Sean Caisse would be the only other driver to lead during the race when he managed to jump into the lead for the first three laps.  With restarts coming with 10 laps to go and again at 4 to go, Kobyluck was able to maintain the lead and go on to win his first race of the season.

Did not Qualify: None

TSI Harley-Davidson 150 
The TSI Harley-Davidson 150 took place on June 6 at Stafford Motor Speedway in Stafford, Connecticut.  Sean Caisse would sit on the pole for the first time this season, but it would be Eddie MacDonald, who was making his first start of the season that would go on to take the win in grand fashion by leading the final 81 laps.

Did not Qualify: None

New England 125 
The New England 125 took place on June 6 at New Hampshire International Speedway in Loudon, New Hampshire.  Joey Logano took the pole and went on to lead the most laps en route to his third win of the series.  Series veteran Brad Leighton was in contention until he was deemed to have jumped the final restart leading to a green-white-checkered finish and subsequently was black flagged.  Rather than risk disqualification, Leighton gave the lead back to Logano and would have to settle for a second-place finish.

Did not Qualify: None

Pepsi Racing 100 
The Pepsi Racing 100 was run on July 14, at Thompson International Speedway in Thompson, CT.  Sean Caisse would sit on the pole and nearly lead flag to flag in the race that was extended to 108 laps due to late race cautions that required two green-white-checkered attempts to end the race.  Caisse only relinquished the lead for two laps en route to his second win of the season, breaking a four race streak of bad luck.

Did not Qualify: (1) Rob Humphreys (#85)

Music City 150 
- Coming Soon

The Edge Hotel 150 
- Coming Soon

Mohegan Sun NASCAR Busch East 200 
- Coming Soon

Mansfield 150 
- Coming Soon

Aubuchon Hardware 125 presented by hardwarestore.com 
- Coming Soon

Sunoco 150 
- Coming Soon

Points Standings 

There are the final points standings for the 2007 season.

See also
 2007 NASCAR Nextel Cup Series
 2007 NASCAR Busch Series
 2007 NASCAR Craftsman Truck Series
 2007 ARCA Re/Max Series
 2007 NASCAR Canadian Tire Series
 2007 NASCAR Corona Series

External links 
Busch East Series Standings and Statistics for 2007

ARCA Menards Series East